The 2001 Indiana Hoosiers football team represented Indiana University Bloomington during the 2001 NCAA Division I-A football season. They participated as members of the Big Ten Conference. The Hoosiers played their home games in Memorial Stadium at Bloomington, Indiana. The team was coached by Cam Cameron in his fifth and final year as head coach. Cameron was fired at the end of the season.

Schedule

Roster

Game summaries

NC State

Iowa

Kentucky

Player stats

Awards and honors
 Antwaan Randle El, Big Ten Offensive Player of the Year
 Antwaan Randle El, Chicago Tribune Silver Football

2002 NFL draftees

References

Indiana
Indiana Hoosiers football seasons
Indiana Hoosiers football